Walter Price may refer to:

 Walter Price (MP), Member of Parliament for Radnorshire in 1571
 Walter Price (cricketer and umpire) (1834–1894), English cricketer and umpire
 Walter H. Price, one of the 'Four Founding Fathers' of Aston Villa Football Club
 Walter Price (Worcestershire cricketer) (1886–1943), English cricketer
 Walter Price (Australian cricketer) (1886–1944), Australian cricketer
 Walter Price (footballer, born 1896) (1896–?), Welsh footballer
 Walter Price (footballer, born 1921) (1921–1984), English footballer
 Walter Price, a pseudonym of the composer Roger C. Wilson
 Big Walter Price (1917–2012), American blues singer, songwriter and pianist
 Wally Price (born 1926), Australian rules footballer
 Walter Price (artist) (born 1989), American painter